Stanley Aaron Wentzel (January 13, 1917 – November 28, 1991) was an American professional baseball player. A longtime minor league outfielder and, later, a manager, Wentzel's only stint in Major League Baseball came at the end of the  season, when he appeared in four games in centerfield for the Boston Braves. The 28-year-old rookie was a native of Lorane, Pennsylvania.

Wentzel is one of many ball players who only appeared in the Major Leagues during the World War II period.  After batting .321 with the Indianapolis Indians of the top-level American Association — where he was named an All-Star and the league's Most Valuable Player — he was called up by Boston and started four games for the Braves in the last week of the season, all against the New York Giants. He got only four hits in 19 at bats (.211), but had six runs batted in. He also scored three runs. In the field, Wentzel recorded eight putouts with no errors.

Herman was promptly named playing manager of the 1947 Pirates, but he was aghast at the cost — Elliott — the Pirates had paid for him. "Why, they've gone and traded the whole team on me", he said. Elliott would win the  National League Most Valuable Player award and lead Boston to the 1948 National League pennant. Herman's 1947 Pirates lost 92 games and finished tied for seventh in the NL, and he resigned before the season's final game.

Wentzel never appeared in a game for the Pirates, but he played and managed in the Pittsburgh farm system through 1958. He died at the age of 74 in St. Lawrence, Pennsylvania.

References

External links

1917 births
1991 deaths
Baseball players from Pennsylvania
Boston Braves players
Burlington-Graham Pirates players
Canton Terriers players
Clinton Pirates players
Hartford Bees players
Hartford Laurels players
Indianapolis Indians players
Logan Indians players
Major League Baseball center fielders
Minor league baseball managers
New Orleans Pelicans (baseball) players
Waco Pirates players
American Association (1902–1997) MVP Award winners